St. Paul's Episcopal Church is a parish of the Episcopal Church in Cleveland Heights, Ohio. The current rector is the Rev. Jeanne Leinbach, installed on October 23, 2015.  She is the first female rector of St. Paul's.  Her predecessor was the Rev. Alan M. Gates, who served from 2004–2014, before his election as Bishop of Massachusetts.  St. Paul's is a leading church and has the largest congregation in the Episcopal Diocese of Ohio.

The church building is a Cleveland Heights landmark.  Located at 2747 Fairmount Blvd, it is a contributing property in the Fairmount Boulevard District, which is listed on the National Register of Historic Places.

St. Paul's was first established in the city of Cleveland, Ohio on October 26, 1846. The congregation did not have its own building until 1851, as a frame building completed in 1849 burned completely. A small brick church in the Gothic Revival style was completed for the parish at Euclid and Sheriff (East 4th) Streets by 1858. St. Paul's congregation outgrew the church, however, as well as a subsequent building at East 40th Street (later sold to the Roman Catholic Church, and renamed the Church of the Conversion of St. Paul the Apostle in 1930). The first service at St. Paul's, Cleveland Heights, was on April 25, 1928. The church was designed by J. Byers Hayes of Walker & Weeks in the English Gothic style. The present nave was dedicated in 1951.  Martin Luther King Jr. spoke there in May 1963 (months before the March on Washington for Jobs and Freedom).

The early music instrument ensemble Apollo's Fire recorded their 2018 album Songs of Orpheus at St. Paul's. The album won the 2019 Grammy Award for Best Classical Vocal Solo.

Organs
The current nave houses three pipe organs. The most notable of these three organs is a 1952 instrument built by local builder Walter Holtkamp. In the late 1980s, the church installed an instrument by the Austrian builder Gerhard Hradetzky. Hradetky's instrument is installed in the rear gallery of the sanctuary. The final, and most recent organ the church has taken possession of is an organ positive by Vladimir Slajch. The current organist and choirmaster of St. Paul's is Karel Paukert.

The Holtkamp organ is considered the "definitive" example for its builder.

References

External links

 St. Paul's Church website

Churches on the National Register of Historic Places in Ohio
Cleveland Heights, Ohio
Episcopal churches in Ohio
Religious organizations established in 1846
Churches in Cuyahoga County, Ohio
National Register of Historic Places in Cuyahoga County, Ohio
Historic district contributing properties in Ohio
1846 establishments in Ohio